USS Gull (AM-74) was a minesweeper acquired by the U.S. Navy for the dangerous task of removing mines from minefields laid in the water to prevent ships from passing.

Gull, formerly trawler Boston College, was built by the Bath Iron Works, Bath, Maine, in 1928; acquired 30 August 1940; converted at the Boston Yards of the Bethlehem Steel Corp. 30 September 1940; and commissioned 3 December 1940.

World War II service 

Attached to the Inshore Patrol, Gull conducted minesweeping operations in Massachusetts Bay until 28 March 1941 when she sailed for Norfolk, Virginia, via Yorktown, Virginia. Homeported at Norfolk 6 April to 26 August 1941, she operated along the Atlantic coast as far north as Boston, Massachusetts, until sailing the latter date for Argentia, Newfoundland, where she put in 4 September.

Gull continued her exacting duties as a minesweeper at Argentia until the summer of 1944, calling at Boston for repairs as needed.

Decommissioning 

She decommissioned at Quincy, Massachusetts, 25 July 1944. Stricken from the Navy List 22 August 1944, she was transferred to the Maritime Commission for disposal 15 May 1946. She was sold the same month and served commercially as Gudrun.

Lost at sea 
The Gudrun which left Gloucester on Wednesday, 3 January 1951, for a trip of dabs for Gorton-Pew Fisheries Co. LTD,. Radioed at 3.24 o’clock Sunday morning, 14 January, the terse but grim message, "We are sinking" and followed with her position, as being some 180 miles south of Cape Race, Nfld.

Aboard were Capt. Johann Axel Johannsson of West Medford and a crew of 16 men, including seven Gloucester men. Twelve of the crew are known to be married, and they have a total of 35 children. All seven Gloucester members are married and have 19 children.

Whatever happened is still a mystery, for no indication has ever been given as to what transpired through that night, or what fate was met by the vessel and her men.

Gloucester men aboard 
 Harry W. O’Connell, Jr. 28 years, married
 Alphonse Sutherland, 51 years, married, nine children
 Wilfred J. Mello, 36 years, married, two sons
 August E. Hill, 45 years, married, one son
 Daniel Williams, 40 years, married, two stepdaughters
 James J. Cavanaugh, 45, married, five children

Others believed to be crew members 
 Capt. Johan Axel Johannsson, 46, West Medford, owner-master, married two children
 Matthew L. Whalen, 46 years, mate, Somerville, married, 11 children
 Daniel Meagher, 42 years, first engineer, Saugus, married, two children
 Albert Moulden, 63 years, second engineer, Sharon, married
 Frank B. Nickerson, 49 years, Braintree, married, one child
 John Johnson, 68 years, Boston
 John Kozlowski, 62 years, Tolland, Conn.

References 
 

Specific

External links 
 NavSource Online: Mine Warfare Vessel Photo Archive – Gull (AM 74)

Ships built in Bath, Maine
1928 ships
Minesweepers of the United States Navy
World War II minesweepers of the United States